The women's aerials competition in freestyle skiing at the 2022 Winter Olympics was held on 14 February at the Genting Snow Park in Zhangjiakou. Xu Mengtao of China won the event, which became her first Olympic gold medal. Hanna Huskova of Belarus won the silver medal, and Megan Nick of the United States bronze, also her first Olympic medal.

The defending champion is Hanna Huskova. The 2018 silver medalist Zhang Xin did not qualify for the Olympics, but the bronze medalist Kong Fanyu did. Xu Mengtao was leading the 2021–22 FIS Freestyle Ski World Cup ranking before the Olympics, with Kong Fanyu close second. Laura Peel is the 2021 world champion.

Qualification

A total of 25 aerialists qualified to compete at the games. For an athlete to compete they must have a minimum of 80.00 FIS points on the FIS Points List on January 17, 2022 and a top 30 finish in a World Cup event or at the FIS Freestyle Ski World Championships 2021. A country could enter a maximum of four athletes into the event.

Results

Qualification 1

Qualification 2

Finals

References

Women's freestyle skiing at the 2022 Winter Olympics